Lukáš Zich (born 10 January 1985) is a Czech football goalkeeper. He previously notably played for Sparta Prague or Ružomberok.

References

 Profile at iDNES.cz

1985 births
Living people
Czech footballers
Czech expatriate footballers
Association football goalkeepers
AC Sparta Prague players
Bohemians 1905 players
FC Slovan Liberec players
FK Jablonec players
FC Hradec Králové players
MFK Ružomberok players
FK Viktoria Žižkov players
Czech First League players
Slovak Super Liga players
Czech National Football League players
Expatriate footballers in Slovakia
Czech expatriate sportspeople in Slovakia
Footballers from Prague